The Dean of Connor is based at Christ Church Cathedral, Lisburn in the Diocese of Connor (Church of Ireland) within the Church of Ireland. The chapter is however known as the Chapter of St Saviours, Connor after the previous (prior to 1662) cathedral church in Connor.

The current incumbent is the Very Reverend Sam Wright.

List of deans
1609–1615 Milo Whale (first dean) 
1615 Robert Openshawe
1628 Richard Shuckburgh 
1640–1661 Robert Price (afterwards Bishop of Ferns, 1661) 
1660/1–1662 Francis Marsh (afterwards Dean of Armagh, 1662 and later Bishop of Limerick, Ardfert and Aghadoe, 1667) 
1661–1667 George Rust (afterwards Bishop of Dromore, 1667) 
1667–1679 Patrick Sheridan (afterwards Bishop of Cloyne, 1679) 
1679–1694 Thomas Ward (deprived for immoral conduct, 1694) 
1694–1704 George Walter Story (afterwards Dean of Limerick, 1704) 
1704–?1709 Martin Baxter
1709/10–1738 Eugene (or Owen) Lloyd
1739–1743 George Cuppage 
1743–1753 John Walsh 
1753–1775 Hill Benson
1775–1802 Richard Dobbs 
1802–1811 Thomas Graves
1811–1824 Theophilus Blakely (afterwards Dean of Achonry, 1811) 
1825–1838 Henry Leslie
1839–1855 John Chaine
1855–?1888 George Bull 
1888–1893 John Walton Murray
1893–1907 Charles Seaver 
1907–1908 Walter Riddall 
1908–1910 John Bristow 
1910–?1931 William Dowse 
1932–?1945 Maurice Henry Fitzgerald Collis
1945–1956  John William Cooke 
1956–1963 Richard Simons Breen
1963–1976 Richard Adams
1976–1981 William Gilbert Wilson (afterwards Bishop of Kilmore, Elphin and Ardagh, 1981)
1981–1990 William Norman Cochrane Barr
1990–1995 James Alexander Fair
1995–1995 Frederick Rusk
1998–2001 Brian Moller 
2001–2016 John Frederick Augustus Bond
2016–present Sam Wright

References

Connor
 
Diocese of Connor (Church of Ireland)
Diocese of Connor